The 2019 CS Nepela Memorial, formerly known as the Ondrej Nepela Trophy, was held in September 2019 at the Ondrej Nepela Arena. It was part of the 2019–20 ISU Challenger Series. Medals were awarded in the disciplines of men's singles, ladies' singles, and ice dance.

Entries
The International Skating Union published the list of entries on August 27, 2019.

Changes to preliminary assignments

Records

The following new ISU best scores were set during this competition:

Results

Men

Ladies

Ice dance

References

External links 
 Official website

CS Ondrej Nepela
2019 in Slovak sport